Aethiophysa falcatalis is a moth in the family Crambidae. It is found in the West Indies.

References

Moths described in 1895
Glaphyriinae
Moths of the Caribbean